Trinity Catholic College (known as Kavanagh College before 2023) is a Catholic, state-integrated, co-educational, secondary school located in central Dunedin, New Zealand. The school was founded in 1989 as the successor of several other secondary (and one intermediate) schools the oldest of which was founded in 1871. Trinity is the only Catholic secondary school in Dunedin and is open to enrolments from throughout the entire city. The school's proprietor is the Bishop of Dunedin.

History

Kavanagh College
Trinity College began operations in 1989 (under the name Kavanagh College) on the former sites and in the former buildings of St Paul's High School (formerly called Christian Brothers High School), the Christian Brothers Junior School and St Dominic's College, between Rattray and Tennyson streets, the three sites being adjacent to each other. The college was named after the fourth Catholic Bishop of Dunedin John Patrick Kavanagh (Bishop, 1957–1985). 

Due to a lack of space, the junior classes were accommodated at "south site" (formerly Moreau College) until 1993 when a new 18 classroom block was completed at a cost of $4 million. Further redevelopment in the 1990s saw the completion of a biology laboratory in an extended science block, the construction of a new auditorium accommodating 411 people and remodelled library, music studios and offices.

In 2011, the college expanded from its restricted main site by purchasing buildings and a carpark on the opposite side of Tennyson Street from Otago Polytechnic and thus increasing the area of the college by 25%. Two of the buildings were demolished, their sites becoming a green area used for school recreation. One of the buildings was kept and used for 6 classrooms. That building (on the corner of York Place) has a historic connection with the important New Zealand artist Colin McCahon as that was where he was trained.

The college's silver jubilee (25 years) was celebrated on 25 October 2014 with a well-attended Mass at the Forsyth Barr Stadium, Dunedin. This was also a celebration of the sesquicentennial of Catholic education in Dunedin (150 years), with each of the city's parishes and schools participating. When Mass came to an end, a plaque honouring the college's three founding orders – the Christian Brothers, Dominican Sisters and Sisters of Mercy was blessed and subsequently placed at the college.

Trinity Catholic College
In March 2022 it was announced that the school name would be changed to Trinity Catholic College in 2023. The name change followed an investigation in which the church found Bishop Kavanagh "failed to take appropriate action over claims of abuse" and "had previously let survivors down badly".

Character
The college is a large central city co-educational school which serves the entire city of Dunedin as the only Catholic secondary school in that city. It is an integrated school with a "special character" in terms of the Private Schools Conditional Integration Act 1975. This special character is broadly the connection of the school with the Catholic faith. Preference of enrolment is given to students who have established a link with the Catholic Church through baptism or membership of a parish. Preference is decided by the appropriate parish priest in each case. A preference certificate from the student's parish is required for each student with their application for enrolment at the school. Under the Act, the school may enrol "non-preference" students but the enrolment of such students is restricted to 5% of the total roll. The College does not have an enrolment scheme which means that there is no restriction on enrolment because of a student's location of residence. The main contributing schools to the college are the Catholic parish schools of Dunedin. Enrolments come from both urban schools and rural schools.

Roll of Honour
Trinity honours former students who died in war. Many former Christian Brothers students died on war service during the First World War. For example, there were at least 83 war deaths from an average school attendance in 1893–1895 of 256 boys meaning that 32.42 percent of boys enrolled at that time died overseas in action.
49 ex-students of the Christian Brothers died in World War II .

Culture
The college emphasises cultural accomplishment including drama group and a Television Network. A Cultural Awards ceremony is held annually to celebrate cultural achievement. Each year all Trinity College students are given the opportunity to participate in the annual musical. The students can participate in the cast, band, or technical crew. The annual musicals have been as follows:
 West Side Story (2002); 
 Fame (2003); 
 Godspell (2004); 
 Les Misérables (2005); 
 The Wiz (2006); 
 The Boy Friend (2007); 
 Footloose (2008); 
 Disco Inferno (2009); 
 Jesus Christ Superstar (2010); 
 Grease (2011); 
 Chicago (2012); 
 Cabaret (2013); 
 A Dream To Share (a montage of songs from a variety of past musicals, celebrating 25 years of Kavanagh musicals) (2014); 
 Oliver! (2015); 
 The Wizard of Oz (2016); 
 Bugsy Malone (2017); 
 Beauty and the Beast (2018); 
 Annie (2019)
Grease (2020)
Seussical (2021)

Sport
The College participates in many sporting codes. It has a particular reputation as one of New Zealand's leading rowing schools.

Principals

Antecedents

The first Catholic school (1863)
The Otago settlement was established in 1848 and had an overwhelmingly Presbyterian character. There were very few Catholics there. However, in March 1861 gold was discovered at the Lindis Pass and Gabriel Read made public his successful discovery of gold at Tuapeka in June. The situation dramatically changed. Every steamer reaching Port Chalmers or Bluff was packed with would-be miners, many of whom were Catholics. Accordingly, Bishop Viard (Bishop of the Catholic diocese of Wellington in which Dunedin was located at that time) appointed Father Delphin Moreau SM, who had visited Otago in April 1859, to be its first resident priest. Mass was said in the courthouse until St Joseph's Church was completed in July 1862. In 1864 the Catholic population of Otago was estimated at over 15,000; chapels (many of them rough and ready) sprang up in the diggings and main towns, and schools came into existence. A school was opened in 1863 and was called St Joseph's School (it still exists as a primary school). "When the old wooden Provincial Government buildings were replaced by new brick ones, the former were sold. Father Moreau secured some of them for his school. One large room was put on the side of the Rattrey Street gully, below the church. It was divided into two parts – one for the boys and one for the girls. Other parts of the buildings were used as a coach house and stables. In 1864, the boys at the school were taught by Mr Shepherd and the girls were taught by Miss Campion. In 1870 Mr Shepherd still taught the boys and the girls were taught by Miss Conway. "Father Moreau took a great interest in the schools and was constantly among the children in the playground, always wearing his cassock which was green with age; he knew every child and was loved by them all. His hope was to obtain brothers and nuns to staff his schools."

St Dominic's College (1871–1976)
On Monday 20 February 1871, the Dominican Sisters who had arrived with the first Catholic Bishop of Dunedin, Patrick Moran, on 11 February, took charge of the girls' school. On 27 February a High School, St Dominic's College, for day pupils was opened. This school also took a small number of boarders. There were 27 boarders in a total roll of approximately 200 in 1971, the centennial year of the college. The college existed in architectural splendour until 1976 being attached to the neo-gothic St Dominic's Priory (completed 1877), one of leading architect Francis Petre's "earliest commissions and one of his finest works" and being adjacent to Petre's St. Joseph's Cathedral, Dunedin (completed 1886).

Christian Brothers School (St Paul's High School) (1876–1989)
On the morning of Sunday, 2 April 1876, four Irish Christian Brothers arrived in Dunedin at the invitation of Bishop Moran to establish a secondary school for boys. "They were met by Bishop Moran and a group of Catholics and driven rapidly to Dunedin where, at 11.00 am Mass, Brothers Bodkin, Dunne, Healey and McMahon were introduced to the people." A school for boys was built on Rattray Street. In 1915 a new brick building fronting Tennyson Street replaced the original school. The name of the school changed to Christian Brothers High School in 1928. Rapidly rising rolls in the 1950s led to the diocese purchasing properties in both Rattray and Tennyson Streets and converting them to classrooms." It was clear that the rebuilding of Christian Brothers High School was not sufficient and that a more permanent solution was called for. This occurred in 1964, when a fine new building was erected fronting Rattray St, and Christian Brothers High School became St Pauls High School. The school celebrated its centennial in 1976. The older school building, housing the primary department, became a separate entity and was known as Christian Brothers' Junior School. The Christian Brothers lived opposite the school. The school closed in 1989.

St Aloysius College, Wakari (1878–1883)
A short-lived secondary boarding and day school for boys was operated by the Jesuits at Wakari. The school was established by two Irish Jesuits, Joseph O'Malley and Thomas McEnroe, and had 15 boarders and 6 day pupils. It was promoted by Bishop Moran but was not popular. The site later became a golf course (the Balmacewen course of the Otago Golf Club). One of the holes (the 10th) is called "the monastery" in memory of the Jesuit connection.

St Philomena's College (1897–1976)
On the morning of Sunday, 17 January 1897, the Sisters of Mercy arrived in Dunedin from Ireland at the invitation of Michael Verdon the second Catholic Bishop of Dunedin. The sisters established themselves in South Dunedin and in April 1897 opened a high school for girls. It was opened " ... with the very small roll of four pupils." This was the beginning of St Philomena's College.

St Edmund's School (1949–1989)
To help relieve the pressure on the Christian Brother's Rattray Street school roll a second school, St Edmund's, was opened in South Dunedin in 1949. This was a primary school for boys from about 9 years of age to 12 years of age (Standard 3 (Year 5) to Form 2 (Year 8)). The school closed as part of the reorganising of the Catholic schools in Dunedin in 1989.

Moreau College (1976–1989)
Early in the 1970s the roll numbers at both of Dunedin's Catholic girls' colleges, St Dominic's and St Philomena's, showed a slight reduction. At the same time, the demand for a greater variety of options for girls, particularly in the upper secondary classes, was gradually increasing so that it was becoming more difficult to maintain a full secondary school with a roll of less than 500. "It also had to be taken into account that the buildings at St Dominic's in Rattray Street were deteriorating and the cost of repair or renewal was considerable." The buildings at St Philomena's were newer and in a much better condition. It was therefore decided to merge the two schools on the St Philomena's site in 1976. The new college was called Moreau College after the first resident priest of Dunedin. Moreau College was closed in 1989 and its students transferred to the new college.

Confluence (1989)
In 1989 the new Catholic co-educational school, then named Kavanagh College, resulting from the amalgamation of Moreau College for girls and St Paul's High School (i.e. the Christian Brothers School) for boys, commenced. The senior classes of St Edmund's School (i.e. years 7 and 8) transferred to the new college. The junior classes (Years 5 and 6) were accommodated in Dunedin Catholic primary schools and St Edmund's closed. The religious orders of Dominican Sisters, Christian Brothers, and the Sisters of Mercy were the teaching foundation of the amalgamation. Vincent Jury was appointed as the first principal of the new college. He was the last of the 23 Christian Brother Principals to exercise authority in Rattray Street in the 115 years from 1876 to 1991. The decision to end the tradition of Catholic single-sex education in Dunedin (especially the closing of Moreau College) and to combine the Catholic secondary schools into a co-educational college was controversial especially in relation to senior staff appointments at the new college.

From the beginning of 2023, the college was renamed Trinity Catholic College. A dawn blessing for the school was held on the 30th of January 2023 to mark the change of name and acknowledge the historical mistakes made by the school's previous namesake, Bishop John Kavanagh. Bishop Michael Dooley stated that he hoped the blessing represented a beginning in the darkness which will work its way into the light.

Notable students and alumni 

The following persons were educated at Trinity Catholic College or any of its predecessor schools.

The arts 
 Winifred Kathleen Joan Davin – teacher, community worker, editor (St Dominic's)
 Kylie Price – singer-songwriter
 Jordan Mullin – ballerina, Staatsballet Berlin

Business 
 Andrew Todd – businessman (Christian Brothers)
 Bryan Todd – businessman (Christian Brothers)

Church 
 James Liston – bishop (Christian Brothers)
 Peter McKeefry – cardinal (Christian Brothers)
 Hugh O'Neill – bishop (Christian Brothers)

Journalism
 D. J. Cameron – journalist and sportswriter (Christian Brothers)
 Nora Kelly – journalist, poet and playwright (St Dominic's)

Politics, law and public service 
 Margaret Austin – politician (St Dominic's)
 John Callan – judge (Christian Brothers)
 Mick Connelly – politician (Christian Brothers)
 Clare Curran – politician (Moreau)
 Marian Hobbs – (St Dominic's)
 Brian MacDonell – politician (Christian Brothers)
 Patrick O'Dea – public servant (Christian Brothers)
 Foss Shanahan – diplomat and public servant (Christian Brothers)
 Joe Walding – politician (Christian Brothers)
 David Wilson – parliamentary official (St Paul's)
 Michael Woodhouse – politician (St Paul's)

Science and medicine 
 Morva Croxson – music therapist, university chancellor (St Dominics)
 Kathleen Todd – child psychiatrist, philanthropist (St Dominic's)

Sport 
 Nick Beard – cricketer
 Andrew Boyens – association footballer
 Michael Bracewell – cricketer
 William Butler – cricket player and umpire (Christian Brothers)
 Steve Casey – rugby union player (Christian Brothers)
 Sean Eathorne – cricketer
 Erika Fairweather – swimmer
 Richard Fogarty – rugby union player (Christian Brothers)
 Anthony Harris – cricketer
 Bert Lowe – boxer (Christian brothers)
 Zoe McBride – rower
 Brian McCleary – rugby union player and boxer (Christian Brothers)
 Craig Miller – wrestler 
 Kilisitina Moata'ane – rugby union player
 Ti'i Paulo – rugby union player
 Kevin Skinner – rugby union player (Christian Brothers)
 Sio Tomkinson – rugby union player
 Lindsay Townsend – rugby union player (Christian Brothers)

Notes

References

 A G Butchers, Young New Zealand, Dunedin, Coulls Somerville Wilkie Ltd., Dunedin, 1929.
 
 Sister Mary Augustine McCarthy, O.P., Star in the South: The Centennial History of the New Zealand Dominican Sisters, St Dominic's Priory, Dunedin, 1970.
 
 Sister M Stephanie, Divide and Share: The Story of Mercy in the South 1897–1997, The Sisters of Mercy, Dunedin 1996.
 Sister M Regis (ed), The Philomenian; Celebrating 100 years, St Philomena's College, Centenary Committee, Dunedin, 1997.
 Graeme Donaldson, To All Parts of the Kingdom: Christian Brothers in New Zealand 1876–2001, Christian Brothers New Zealand Province, Christchurch, 2001, pp. 5 and 6.

External links
 Catholic-hierarchy website
 Catholic Diocese of Dunedin
 Catholic Church in New Zealand
 Trinity Catholic College
 Education Review Office report

Dominican schools in New Zealand
Congregation of Christian Brothers secondary schools
Congregation of Christian Brothers in New Zealand
Sisters of Mercy schools
Educational institutions established in 1871
Secondary schools in Dunedin
Catholic secondary schools in Dunedin
1871 establishments in New Zealand
Sexual abuse cover-ups
Jesuit secondary schools in New Zealand